Bala/Muskoka Float Flying Club Water Aerodrome  is located on Lake Muskoka,  east northeast of Bala, Ontario, Canada.

See also
List of airports in the Bala, Ontario area

References

Registered aerodromes in Ontario
Seaplane bases in Ontario

Transport in Bala, Ontario